KUDD (105.1 FM, "Mix 105.1") is an American radio station broadcasting a Top 40 (CHR) format serving Salt Lake City and surrounding areas, that's licensed to American Fork, Utah. This station is owned by Dell Loy Hansen, through Broadway Media LS, LLC. Its studios are in Downtown Salt Lake City and its transmitter site is located southwest of the city of Farnsworth Peak in the Oquirrh Mountains.

KUDD has been granted a U.S. Federal Communications Commission construction permit to change the city of license to American Fork, Utah (from Roy, Utah), move to a new transmitter site, decrease ERP to 15,000 watts and increase HAAT to 1,243 meters.

History
The station signed on the air in December 1978 with the call letters KMXU. On January 9, 2004, the station changed its call sign to KNJQ. On June 7, 2006, the station changed its call sign to KAUU.

Until October 27, 2015, 105.1 had been simulcasting sister station KEGA; on that date, the station began stunting with Christmas music as "105.1 The Gift", when it moved to Farnsworth Peak from its former transmitter site east of Hop Creek Ridge in central Utah. The station also changed its city of license from Manti, Utah to American Fork.

On December 2, 2015 Broadway announced they would donate KUDD to Community Wireless, which in turn would move KPCW-FM down from 91.9 to 91.7, with the "Mix" format moving to 105.1.

On December 27, 2015 the station shifted to dance music as just "105.1 FM" as a placeholder format until the move took place on March 31, 2016 at 10:51 a.m., with "New Romantics" by Taylor Swift as the first song after the move. The station concurrently changed its call sign to KUDD with the move.

HD Radio
KUDD broadcasts in HD Radio with three subchannels: 

 KUDD-HD1 is a digital simulcast of the analog signal 
 KUDD-HD2 airs Oldies "Kool FM"
 KUDD-HD3 airs KUUU Rhythmic AC

References

External links

UDD
Radio stations established in 1978
1978 establishments in Utah
Contemporary hit radio stations in the United States